Euclea racemosa (the sea guarrie or dune guarrie) is a small to medium-sized evergreen tree that is indigenous to the Indian Ocean coast of Africa from Egypt to South Africa, as well as in Comoros, Oman and Yemen.

Euclea racemosa has leathery foliage that can be exceptionally even and dense - making it an ideal plant for hedges. A dioecious tree (male and female flowers on separate trees), it produces small white flowers, which are followed by red, purple and black fruits that attract birds.
The berries are used locally to make "Guarrie vinegar".

The name guarrie appears to derive from  the local Khoe language, in which it is spelled gwarri.

Pictures

Classification
subspecies
 Euclea racemosa subsp. bernardii F.White - Cape Province
 Euclea racemosa subsp. daphnoides (Hiern) F.White  - Cape Province, KwaZulu-Natal, Eswatini, Mpumalanga, Limpopo
 Euclea racemosa subsp. macrophylla (E.Mey. ex A.DC.) F.White - Cape Province, KwaZulu-Natal
 Euclea racemosa subsp. racemosa - Cape Province
 Euclea racemosa subsp. schimperi (A.DC.) F.White - most of species range
 Euclea racemosa subsp. sinuata F.White - Mozambique, KwaZulu-Natal
 Euclea racemosa subsp. zuluensis F.White - Eswatini, Mozambique, KwaZulu-Natal

References

racemosa
Trees of Africa
Flora of the Comoros
Flora of Oman
Flora of Yemen
Plants described in 1774
Taxa named by Carl Linnaeus
Dioecious plants